The 2014–15 RFU Championship, known for sponsorship reasons as the Greene King IPA Championship, is the sixth season of the professionalised format of the RFU Championship, the second tier of the English rugby union league system run by the Rugby Football Union. It is contested by eleven English clubs and one from Jersey in the Channel Islands. This is the second year of the competition's sponsorship with Greene King Brewery, which runs until 2017. The twelve teams in the RFU Championship also competed in the British and Irish Cup, along with clubs from Ireland and Wales. Matches in the RFU Championship were broadcast on Sky Sports.

Worcester Warriors finished second during the regular season and became champions after beating Bristol 59 – 58 in the two-legged final. The Warriors overcame third-place London Scottish in the semifinal play-off, while Bristol (who finished first in the league table) beat fourth-place Rotherham Titans in the other semi-final. After thirteen seasons in the second tier of English rugby union, Plymouth Albion are relegated to the 2015–16 National League 1 for next season, after finishing in last place.

Structure
The Championship's structure has all the teams playing each other on a home and away basis. The play–off structure will remain the same as the previous year. The top four teams at the end of the home–and–away season qualify for the promotion play–offs which follow a 1 v 4, 2 v 3 system. The winners have to meet the RFU's Minimum Standards Criteria in order to be promoted to the Premiership. If they fail to meet the criteria then there is no promotion. There are no relegation play–offs; the bottom team is automatically relegated. Following an agreement with the RFU in 2012, each RFU Championship club will receive £365,000 in funding from the RFU for the season.

Participating teams and locations
Ten of the teams that competed in the 2013–14 RFU Championship remain in the competition for the 2014–15 RFU Championship. London Welsh were promoted back into the English Premiership after defeating Bristol in the play-off final after being relegated into the RFU Championship the previous year. They are replaced by Worcester Warriors after they were relegated to the RFU Championship after finishing last in the 2013–14 English Premiership. Ealing Trailfinders were relegated into National League 1 after finishing bottom of the 2013–14 RFU Championship by one point. They are replaced by Doncaster Knights, who returned to the RFU Championship at the first opportunity by finishing top of the 2013–14 National League 1 after being relegated in 2013. This was the first time that a relegated team returned to the RFU Championship after being relegated the previous season since the RFU Championship was formed.

Below is a list of the teams participating in the 2014–15 RFU Championship.

League table

Fixtures

Round 1

Round 2

Round 3

Round 4

Round 5

Round 6

Round 7

Round 8

Round 9

Round 10

Round 11

Round 12

Round 13

Round 14

Round 15

Round 16

Round 17

Round 18

Round 19

Round 20

Round 21

Round 22

Play-offs

Semi-finals
The semifinals followed a 1 v 4, 2 v 3 system – with the games being played over two-legs with the higher placed team deciding who played at home in the first leg.

First leg

Second leg

 Worcester Warriors won 65 – 37 on aggregate

 Bristol Rugby won 56 – 36  on aggregate

Final
The final is played over two legs – with the higher placed team deciding who played at home in the first leg.

First leg

Second leg

Worcester win 59 – 58 on aggregate

Attendances
Includes play-off games where applicable

Individual statistics
 Note that points scorers includes tries as well as conversions, penalties and drop goals.  Stats also include promotion play-offs.

Top points scorers

Top try scorers

RFU Dream Team XV 
The RFU Dream Team is picked by the coaches of the twelve championship teams. Bristol playmaker Morgan attracted the highest number of votes for an individual player with eight, one more than Cornish Pirates pair Tom Kessell and Darren Barry and Nottingham's Shaun Malton. Meanwhile, London Scottish number 8 Bright makes the Dream Team for the third year in a row and is the only player to retain his place from last season.

15 Paul Jarvis (Doncaster Knights)
14 Sam Smith (Worcester Warriors)
13 Max Stelling (Worcester Warriors)
12 Andy Symons (Worcester Warriors)
11 David Lemi (Bristol Rugby)
10 Matthew Morgan (Bristol Rugby)
 9 Tom Kessell (Cornish Pirates)
 1 Sam Lockwood (Jersey)
 2 Shaun Malton (Nottingham Rugby)
 3 Harry Williams (Jersey)
 4 Mike Williams (Worcester Warriors)
 5 Darren Barry (Cornish Pirates)
 6 Alex Rieder (Rotherham Titans)
 7 Jack Preece (Rotherham Titans)
 8 Mark Bright (London Scottish)

Season records

Team
Largest home win — 51 pts
65 - 14 Cornish Pirates at home to Bedford Blues on 23 November 2014
Largest away win — 61 pts
69 - 8 Worcester Warriors away to Cornish Pirates on 18 April 2015
Most points scored — 69 pts
69 - 8 Worcester Warriors away to Cornish Pirates on 18 April 2015
Most tries in a match — 10 (x2)
London Scottish at home to Plymouth Albion on 4 October 2014
Worcester Warriors away to Cornish Pirates on 18 April 2015
Most conversions in a match — 8
Worcester Warriors away to Cornish Pirates on 18 April 2015
Most penalties in a match — 7 (x2)
Moseley away to Doncaster Knights on 15 November 2014
London Scottish away to Nottingham Rugby on 4 January 2015 
Most drop goals in a match — 1
N/A - multiple teams

Player
Most points in a match — 25
 Lawrence Rayner for Plymouth Albion away to Rotherham Titans on 20 September 2014
Most tries in a match — 4 (x2)
 Sam Smith for Worcester Warriors away to Yorkshire Carnegie on 27 December 2014
 Olly Robinson for Bristol Rugby away to Plymouth Albion on 11 April 2015
Most conversions in a match — 8
 Andy Symons for Worcester Warriors away to Cornish Pirates on 18 April 2015
Most penalties in a match —  7 (x2)
 Sam Olver for Moseley away to Doncaster Knights on 15 November 2014
 Peter Lydon for London Scottish away to Nottingham Rugby on 4 January 2015 
Most drop goals in a match —  1
N/A - multiple players

Attendances
Highest — 12,024 
Worcester Warriors at home to Bristol on 27 May 2015
Lowest — 631 
Moseley at home to London Scottish on 8 November 2014
Highest Average Attendance — 8,055
Bristol Rugby
Lowest Average Attendance — 1,098
Moseley

References

External links
 RFU Championship news

 
2014–15 in English rugby union leagues
2014-15